The Penn State–Temple football rivalry is an American college football rivalry between the Penn State Nittany Lions and Temple Owls. In a series dating back to 1931, Penn State has a series advantage, having won 40 out of 45 games. The schools make up 2 of the 3 universities in the state of Pennsylvania which still compete in the Football Bowl Subdivision of the National Collegiate Athletic Association.

History

The first game between Temple and Penn State was played in Philadelphia in 1931 with Temple winning by a score of 12–0. Penn State got their first win in the rivalry in 1940 with an 18–0 win over Temple. Temple's 14–0 win against Penn State in 1941 would serve as the last time the Owls had a win in the rivalry until 2015. That win would also secure Temple a 3–1 series lead, which remains the Owl's largest winning lead in the series. The 1942 contest was canceled because of World War II. The first game in State College, in 1943, was a 13–0 win for Penn State at New Beaver Field. The 1950 matchup between the two teams ended in the series only tie.

Penn State's 31–30 victory over Temple in 1976 is viewed as the closest game in the rivalry's history. Temple scored a late goal line touchdown to bring the score within one point, with just seconds remaining, but the Owls attempted game winning two-point was unsuccessful.  The matchup, played at Veterans Stadium, was moved up a week to accommodate the United States Bicentennial that was planned to take place in Philadelphia. In 1995, Penn State beat Temple by a score of 66–14, which remains the largest margin of victory for either team in the series. The 1996 iteration of the matchup, a 41–0 win for Penn State, took place at Giants Stadium in the Meadowlands Sports Complex. Temple's 27–10 victory over Penn State in 2015 broke a 31-game losing streak against the Nittany Lions. It remains the 4th longest losing streak to an opponent in college football history.

The Nittany Lions and the Owls last played in 2016 where Penn State beat Temple by a score of 34–27. The schools will renew the series with matchups in 2026 and 2027.

Game results

See also 
 List of NCAA college football rivalry games

References

College football rivalries in the United States
Penn State Nittany Lions football
Temple Owls football
1931 establishments in Pennsylvania